Seyyed Karim-e Kushki (also Romanized as Seyyed Karīm-e Kūshkī and Seyyed Karīm Kūshkī; also known as faferata) is a village in Tarhan-e Gharbi Rural District, Tarhan District, Kuhdasht County, Lorestan Province, Iran. At the 2003 census, its population was 252, in 205 families.

References 

Towns and villages in Kuhdasht County